This is a list of schools in the London Borough of Lambeth, England.

State-funded schools

Primary schools

Allen Edwards Primary School
Archbishop Sumner CE Primary School
Ashmole Primary School
Bonneville Primary School
Christ Church Primary SW9
Christ Church Streatham CE Primary School
Clapham Manor Primary School
Corpus Christi RC Primary School
Crown Lane Primary School
Dunraven School
Elm Wood Primary School
Fenstanton Primary School
Glenbrook Primary School
Granton Primary School
Heathbrook Primary School
Henry Cavendish Primary School	
Henry Fawcett Primary School
Herbert Morrison Primary School
Hill Mead Primary School
Hitherfield Primary School
Holy Trinity CE Primary School
Immanuel and St Andrew CE Primary School
Iqra Primary School
Jessop Primary School
Jubilee Primary School
Julian's School
Kings Avenue School
Kingswood Primary School
Lark Hall Primary School
Loughborough Primary School
Macaulay CE Primary School
Oasis Academy Johanna
The Orchard School
Paxton Primary School
Reay Primary School
Richard Atkins Primary School
Rosendale Primary School
St Andrew's CE Primary School
St Andrew's RC Primary School
St Anne's RC Primary School
St Bede's RC Infant School
St Bernadette RC Junior School
St Helen's RC Primary School
St John the Divine CE Primary School
St John's Angell Town CE Primary School
St Jude's CE Primary School
St Leonard's CE Primary School
St Luke's CE Primary School
St Mark's CE Primary School
St Mary's RC Primary School
St Saviour's CE Primary School
St Stephen's CE Primary School
Stockwell Primary School
Streatham Wells Primary School
Sudbourne Primary School
Sunnyhill Primary School
Telferscot Primary School
Van Gogh Primary
Vauxhall Primary School
Walnut Tree Walk Primary School
Woodmansterne School
Wyvil Primary School

Secondary schools

Archbishop Tenison's School
Ark Evelyn Grace Academy
Bishop Thomas Grant School	
City Heights E-ACT Academy
Dunraven School	
Elmgreen School
Harris Academy Clapham
La Retraite Roman Catholic Girls' School
Lambeth Academy	
Lilian Baylis Technology School	
London Nautical School	
The Norwood School	
Oasis Academy South Bank
Platanos College
St Gabriel's College
St Martin-in-the-Fields High School for Girls
South Bank Engineering UTC
Trinity Academy
Woodmansterne School

Special and alternative schools
Elm Court School
Evolve Academy
Heron Academy
Lansdowne School
The Livity School
NAS Vanguard School
Turney Primary and Secondary Special School

Further education
Harris Clapham Sixth Form
King's College London Mathematics School
Lambeth College
The Marine Society College of the Sea (distance education)
Morley College

Independent schools

Primary and preparatory schools
London Steiner School
Oakfield Preparatory School
Rosemead Preparatory School
The White House Preparatory School

Senior and all-through schools
DLD College
Streatham and Clapham High School

Special and alternative schools
JUS Education
Octavia House School

External links
Schools - Lambeth Borough Council

Lambeth
Schools in the London Borough of Lambeth